Vila Madalena is a Brazilian telenovela produced and broadcast at the 7pm timeslot by TV Globo from November 8, 1999, to May 5, 2000, in 155 episodes.

The telenovela is written by Walther Negrão, with the collaboration of Thelma Guedes, Elizabeth Jhin, Júlio Fischer, Paulo Cursino, Vinícius Vianna and Ângela Carneiro. It is directed by Jorge Fernando, Roberto Naar, Fabrício Mamberti and Marcus Alvisi.

It stars Edson Celulari, Maitê Proença, Marcos Winter, Herson Capri and Cristiana Oliveira in the main roles.

The telenovela presented an unprecedented opening intro proposal, with a different song for each episode. The songs were those that composed the national soundtrack of the telenovela.

Plot 
Solano Xavier (Edson Celulari) is a man of humble origin who never had formal education. When he takes a job as a truck driver, he unknowingly transports smuggled goods during one of his trips and is sentenced to 17 years in prison. In prison, Solano becomes good friends with Roberto (Marcos Winter), an educated young man who is unjustly imprisoned for the death of a man. While defending his fiancée, Pilar (Cristiana Oliveira), from two thugs harassing her, Roberto accidentally kills one of them, running him over with a car during the fight. With Roberto's influence, Solano spends his time studying. After seven years, he is released from prison due to good behavior and goes to meet his wife and son, but discovers that Eugênia (Maitê Proença) has married his former boss, businessman Arthur Junqueira (Herson Capri), and that they have a daughter together. From then on, Solano has to fight to regain Eugênia's love.

Cast 
Edson Celulari as Solano Xavier
Maitê Proença as Eugênia Junqueira
Cristiana Oliveira as Pilar Ramirez
Herson Capri as Arthur Junqueira
Marcos Winter as Roberto Lopes
Carla Marins as Nancy Xavier
Thierry Figueira as Hugo Lopes
Yoná Magalhães as Abigail "Bibiana" Ramirez
Ary Fontoura as Elpídio Menezes "Seu Menez"
Rosamaria Murtinho as Margot Ramirez
Laura Cardoso as Deolinda Xavier
Flávio Migliaccio as Ângelo Xavier
Luíza Tomé as Raquel
Mário Gomes as Donato
Betty Gofman as Auxiliadora "Lilica"
Marcelo Faria as José Xavier "Zezito"
Fernanda Rodrigues as Zuleika "Zu"
José de Abreu as Viriato
Nívea Maria as Adélia
Oscar Magrini as Aricanduva
Susana Werner as Beatriz "Bia"
Rosi Campos as Marinalva
Roberto Bataglin as Luiz
Cissa Guimarães as Dalva
José Augusto Branco as Dr. Meirelles
Luísa Thiré as Nilda
Bruno Giordano as Juarez Junqueira
Sílvia Bandeira as Elvira
Fernando Almeida as Alfredo
Larissa Queiroz as Tamara
Ana Furtado as Nina
Élcio Romar as Valdir 
Roberto Frota as Valfredo
Rejane Goulart as Mirtes
Jonas Melloas Franco
Hilda Rebello as Isaura
Luciano Vianna as Fábio
Yeda Dantas as Vanda
Leandro Ribeiro as Badu
Joana Limaverde as Marina
Ricardo Pavão as Dr. Américo Novaes
Lina Fróes as Jurema
Murilo Elbas as Sardinha
Daniel Marinho as Gustavo "Guga"
Mônica Mattos as Leda
Marcelo Barros as Formiga
Kenya Costta as Joana
Maria Carol Rebello as Vilma "Vilminha"
Guilherme Vieira as Lucas Junqueira Xavier
Nathalie Figueiredo as Laura

Guest stars 
Helena Fernandes as Luíza
Antônio Abujamra as Frederico Fellini
Fábio Junqueira as Bruno
Marcelo Mansfield as Walmir
Paula Manga as Gigi
Juliana Martins as Carla
Marcélia Cartaxo as Luciene

References

External links

1999 Brazilian television series debuts
2000 Brazilian television series endings
1999 telenovelas
TV Globo telenovelas
Brazilian telenovelas
Television shows set in São Paulo
Portuguese-language telenovelas